Michael Graydon Vandort (born 19 January 1980) is a Sri Lankan cricketer. He is a left-handed batsman and a right-arm medium-pace bowler. He is one of the tallest batsmen ever to play test cricket and stands at 6 feet 5 inches. He made his Twenty20 debut on 17 August 2004, for Colombo Cricket Club in the 2004 SLC Twenty20 Tournament. He is of Dutch Burgher ancestry and was educated at St. Joseph's College.

International career
Having emerged in 2001 after impressive club performances, he was picked against Bangladesh in September 2001 after an impressive century. His Test average was 36.90.  He scored a century in Sri Lanka's defeat to England on 28 May 2006. He nearly became the first batsman since Javed Omar in 2001 to carry the bat through the whole innings. In his one-day international debut against Australia he scored a Test-like 48 off 117 balls in a run-chase of 318, and did not play an ODI for the remainder of his career. However, he was selected to play in the tests against Australia and scored a gritty 83 against Australia in the first test in Brisbane. He is considered a good slips fielder but less effective in the outfield.

He was dropped from the Sri Lankan Test team following a string of poor performances, especially against India in 2008–2009, and has not played in international tests since.

References

1980 births
Burgher sportspeople
Colombo Cricket Club cricketers
Living people
Cricketers from Colombo
Sri Lankan cricketers
Sri Lankan people of Dutch descent
Sri Lanka One Day International cricketers
Sri Lanka Test cricketers
Wayamba cricketers